Vic Bozanic (born 30 October 1957) is an Australian former association footballer. He is the father of Oliver Bozanic who has also played for the Australia national association football team.

Playing career

Club career
Bozanic played for Polonia Adelaide before moving to West Adelaide in the National Soccer League, where he scored what would become the championship winning goal in the last game of the 1978 season against Adelaide City.

He later played for NSL clubs APIA and St George.

International career
Bozanic played one full international match for Australia against Papua New Guinea at the 1980 OFC Nations Cup. He played three matches for Australia at the tournament (only the match against PNG was a full international match), scoring two goals including a goal in the final against Tahiti.

Honours

International
Australia
NSL Championship: 1978
OFC Nations Cup: 1980

References

External links
 Vic Bozanic at Aussie Footballers

1957 births
Living people
Association football defenders
Australian soccer players
Soccer players from Adelaide
Australia international soccer players
National Soccer League (Australia) players
Croydon Kings players
West Adelaide SC players
Australian people of Croatian descent
St George FC players
APIA Leichhardt FC players
1980 Oceania Cup players